Nicolas Vaporidis (born 22 December 1981) is an Italian actor.

Biography
Vaporidis was born in Rome to an Italian mother and a Greek father. He obtained a classical diploma in Rome in 2000, then enrolled in a communication sciences program. He moved to London, where he remained more than a year working as a waiter and attending English classes. After London, Vaporidis returned to Italy and attended the acting school Teatro Azione, directed by Christian Del Bianco Cristiano Censi and Isabella Del Bianco.

In 2002, Vaporidis' first film role was in Il ronzio delle mosche directed by Dario D'Ambrosi and co-starring Greta Scacchi. The following year, Enrico Oldoini gave him the title role in 13dici a tavola.

In 2006, Vaporidis starred opposite Cristiana Capotondi in the film Notte prima degli esami directed by Fausto Brizzi.

Vaporidis' novel Bravissimo a sbagliare was published by Mondadori in 2007.

Personal life
On September 8, 2012, Vaporidis married Giorgia Surina in Mykonos (divorce 2014).

Filmography

Film

Television

References

Male actors from Rome
21st-century Italian male actors
Italian male film actors
Italian male television actors
Italian people of Greek descent
Living people
1982 births
21st-century Italian novelists